Rochester has some of the tallest buildings for a city of its size, including the Broadway Plaza, which upon completion was the tallest residential building in a U.S. city with a metro area of less than 200,000.

Tallest buildings

Buildings with Unknown Heights

Tallest under construction, approved, and proposed

Tallest cancelled

Sources
Emporis - Rochester

Buildings and structures in Rochester, Minnesota

Tallest in Rochester
Rochester, Minnesota